Charles Whittlesey Curtis (born October 13, 1926) is a mathematician and historian of mathematics, known for his work in finite group theory and representation theory. He is a retired professor of mathematics at the University of Oregon.

Research
Curtis introduced Curtis duality, a duality operation on the characters of a reductive group over a finite field. His book with Irving Reiner, was the standard text on representation theory for many years.

Biography
Curtis received a bachelor's degree from Bowdoin College in 1948, and his Ph.D. from Yale University in 1951, under the supervision of Nathan Jacobson. He taught at the University of Wisconsin–Madison from 1954 to 1963. Subsequently, he moved to the University of Oregon, where he is an emeritus professor.

While at Yale, on June 17, 1950 in Cheshire, Connecticut, Curtis married his wife Elizabeth, a kindergarten teacher and childcare provider. At the time of their 50th anniversary in 2000, they had three grandchildren.

In 2012 he became a fellow of the American Mathematical Society.

Publications
.

References

External links
Pictures of C. W. Curtis from Oberwolfach

20th-century American mathematicians
Group theorists
American historians of mathematics
Institute for Advanced Study visiting scholars
Bowdoin College alumni
Yale University alumni
University of Oregon faculty
University of Wisconsin–Madison faculty
Fellows of the American Mathematical Society
1926 births
Living people
21st-century American mathematicians